Bilond (also Romanized as Bīlond; also known as Bīlvand, Bīlownd and Bilūnd) is a village in Howmeh Rural District, in the Central District of Gonabad County, Razavi Khorasan Province, Iran. At the 2006 census, its population was 4,235, in 1,110 families.

References 

Populated places in Gonabad County